Charles Hay,  is the current High Commissioner of the United Kingdom to Malaysia and has been in the posting since April 2019. He is the former British Ambassador to South Korea.

Diplomatic career
Hay joined the Foreign and Commonwealth Office in 1993.

From 2015 to 2018, he served as British Ambassador to South Korea.

On 8 November 2018, Hay was announced as the next High Commissioner of the United Kingdom to Malaysia, in succession to Victoria Treadell. He took up the post in April 2019.

References

Living people
Ambassadors of the United Kingdom to South Korea
High Commissioners of the United Kingdom to Malaysia
20th-century British diplomats
21st-century British diplomats
Year of birth missing (living people)
British Army officers